Albert Rudolph "Dutch" Gutknecht (June 11, 1917 – March 25, 1996) was a professional American football player in the National Football League, at the guard position, for the  Brooklyn Dodgers in 1943 and the Cleveland Rams in 1944. He played college football at Niagara University prior to going professional.

External links

American football guards
Niagara Purple Eagles football players
Brooklyn Dodgers (NFL) players
Cleveland Rams players
Players of American football from Pennsylvania
People from Westmoreland County, Pennsylvania
1917 births
1996 deaths